Bernhard Nermerich (11 March 1939 – 14 July 2010) was a German racewalker. He competed in the men's 50 kilometres walk at the 1968 Summer Olympics.

References

1939 births
2010 deaths
Athletes (track and field) at the 1968 Summer Olympics
German male racewalkers
Olympic athletes of West Germany
Place of birth missing